René Cormier (born April 27, 1956) is a Canadian Acadian artist and activist from New Brunswick. On October 27, 2016, Cormier was named to the Senate of Canada by Prime Minister Justin Trudeau to sit as an independent.  Cormier assumed his seat on November 10, 2016.

Following his appointment to the Senate, Cormier stated that he plans to continue with his work with the SNA, while avoiding any conflicts of interest.

He is out as gay, and spearheaded the creation of the Canadian Pride Caucus, a non-partisan committee of Canada's LGBTQ MPs and senators.

References

External links

1956 births
Acadian people
Artists from New Brunswick
Independent Canadian senators
Living people
Canadian senators from New Brunswick
Canadian theatre directors
21st-century Canadian politicians
Independent Senators Group
Canadian LGBT senators
Gay politicians
21st-century Canadian LGBT people
Canadian gay men